The 2000 women's Olympic volleyball tournament was the tenth edition of the event, organised by the world's governing body, the FIVB in conjunction with the International Olympic Committee. It was held from 16 to 30 September 2000 in the Sydney Entertainment Centre in Darling Harbour.

Qualification

Format
The tournament was played in two different stages. A single round-robin format was played within each pool to determine the teams position in the pool.

The  was played in a single elimination format, with placement matches determining the top eight positions. Starting at the quarterfinals, winners advanced to the semifinals while losers advanced to the placement matches (5th–8th semifinal).

Pools composition
Teams were seeded following the Serpentine system according to their ranking as of January 1996.

Twelve qualified nations were drawn into two groups, each consisting of six teams. After a robin-round, the four highest-placed teams in each group advanced to a knock-out round to decide the medals.

Rosters

Venues
 Sydney Entertainment Centre, Sydney, Australia
 Sydney Showground Pavilion 4, Sydney, Australia

Preliminary round

 All times are Australian Eastern Standard Time (UTC+10:00).
 venues: Sydney Showground Pavilion 4 (matches starting at 12:00 or earlier) and Sydney Entertainment Centre (matches starting at 12:30 or later).

Pool A

|}

|}

Pool B

|}

|}

Final round
 All times are Australian Eastern Standard Time (UTC+10:00).
 venues: Sydney Entertainment Centre (except for 5th–8th places semifinals, which were played at Sydney Showground Pavilion 4).

Quarterfinals

|}

5th–8th places

Semifinals

|}

7th place match

|}

5th place match

|}

1st–4th places

Semifinals

|}

Bronze medal match

|}

Gold medal match

|}

Final standings

Medalists

Individual awards
Most Valuable Player

Best Scorer

Best Spiker

Best Blocker

Best Server

Best Digger

Best Setter

Best Receiver

See also
Men's Olympic Tournament

References

External links
Results
Official Games Results
Final standings (1964–2000) at FIVB.org
Official Games volleyball results (pgs. 1–35, 85–91)

O
W
Women's volleyball in Australia
2000 in Australian women's sport
Women's events at the 2000 Summer Olympics